Maniyy or mazi is a term in Islamic jurisprudence which refers to the sexual fluids of a man or woman.

Understanding the concept of maniyy is important for ascertaining various Islamic states of ritual purity, in particular, as it relates to a ritual bath.

Sources

External links
Maniyy and ritual bathing (ghusl) in Islamic jurisprudence

Arabic words and phrases in Sharia
Islamic jurisprudence
Islamic terminology